Associazione Sportiva Dilettantistica Cynthia 1920 was an Italian association football club located in Genzano di Roma, Lazio.

History 
The club was founded in 1920.

Serie D 
In the season 2006–07 it was promoted in Serie D for the first time.

In the season 2011–12 it was relegated to Eccellenza, but the club will continue to play in Serie D after being readmitted to fill the vacancies created.

In June 2020, Cynthia merged with neighbouring Albano Laziale-based club Albalonga to form Cynthialbalonga.

Colors and badge 
Its colors are white and blue.

References 

Football clubs in Italy
Football clubs in Lazio
Association football clubs established in 1920
Association football clubs established in 2020
Serie C clubs
1920 establishments in Italy
2020 establishments in Italy
Sport in the Metropolitan City of Rome Capital